Downeyville is an unincorporated community in Adams Township, Decatur County, Indiana.

History
Downey was the name of a family who kept a general store at Downeyville. A post office was established at Downeyville in 1876, and remained in operation until it was discontinued in 1903.

Geography

References

Unincorporated communities in Decatur County, Indiana
Unincorporated communities in Indiana